Giulio Calvi (called Il Cobonato) (c. 1570–1596) was an Italian painter of the Renaissance. He was born in Cremona, and active there and at Soncino. He was a pupil of Giovanni Battista Trotti.

References

1570s births
1596 deaths
16th-century Italian painters
Italian male painters
Renaissance painters
Painters from Cremona